Dondo District is a district of Sofala Province in Mozambique. The principal town is
Dondo. The district is located in the center of the province, and borders with Muanza District in the north, the city of Beira and Buzi District in the south, and with Nhamatanda District in the west. In the east, the district is limited by the Indian Ocean. It has a population of 142,387 as of 2007.

Geography
According to the Köppen climate classification, the climate of the district is transitional from tropical rainforest to hot steppe.

There is a coastal forest, the Dondo forest (19°36'S 34°44'E), near the main road (EN 6) to Zimbabwe and 25 miles north of Beira with a species rich flora and fauna, including the eastern green-backed honeyguide, white-chested alethe, Böhm's spinetail, black-headed apalis, speckle-throated woodpecker,  red-winged prinia, east coast akalat, violet-backed sunbird and olive-headed weaver.

History
The Beira Railway, constructed in the end of the 19th century by the Beira Railroad Corporation, a subsidiary of the British South Africa Company, between Beira and Harare, had a considerable impact on the development of the district.

Demographics
As of 2005, 42% of the population of the district was younger than 15 years. 65% did speak Portuguese. The most common mother tongue is Cindau. 57% of the population of the age above five had school education, most of them at primary school level.

Administrative divisions
The district is divided into two postos, Dondo (two localities) and Mafambisse (two localities).

Economy
9% of the households in the district have access to electricity.

Agriculture
In the district, there are 26,000 farms which have on average  of land. The main agricultural products are corn, cassava, cowpea, peanut, sweet potato, ad rice.

Transportation
Dondo is an important railway node and is connected by railways with Beira, Manica and Tete Provinces, as well as Zimbabwe, Malawi, Zambia, Botswana, and the Democratic Republic of the Congo.

References

Districts in Sofala Province